Icius subinermis is a species of jumping spider from the Mediterranean region.

Description
The two sexes have different coloration.

Biology
Icius subinermis favors moist habitats, for example near streams or on moist meadows. It builds a silken retreat in infructescences of rushes or under rocks near rivers or creeks. It will retreat there when the weather is unfavorable.

Distribution
Although it is originally restricted to the western Mediterranean region, it has been occasionally found in greenhouses, for example in Cologne, Germany in 1995. Recently, it has been found in the center of Ljubljana, Slovenia, and there are records from Switzerland and Italy. An introduced North American population in Philadelphia, Pennsylvania, has been described.

Footnotes

References
  (1997): Kosmos-Atlas Spinnentiere Europas. Kosmos. 
  (2020): First records of Icius subinermis (Araneae: Salticidae) in North America, with notes on the local establishment of this species and its behavior in captivity. Peckhamia 226(1): 1-5. PDF
  (2005): New records of jumping spiders (Araneae: Salticidae) for Slovenia. Natura Sloveniae 7(1): 5-11. PDF
  (2008): The world spider catalog, version 9.0. American Museum of Natural History.

External links

 Salticidae.org: Diagnostic drawings and photographs

Salticidae
Spiders of Europe
Spiders described in 1937